The 1940 San Jose State Spartans football team represented San Jose State College during the 1940 college football season.

San Jose State competed in the California Collegiate Athletic Association. The team was led by head coach Ben Winkelman, in his first year, and they played home games at Spartan Stadium in San Jose, California. They finished the season as champions of the CCAA, with a record of eleven wins and one loss (11–1, 3–0 CCAA). The Spartans dominated their opponents, scoring 263 points for the season while giving up only 62. In 10 of the 12 games, their opponents scored a touchdown or less, including four shutouts.

Famed football coach Glenn Scobey "Pop" Warner was an advisory coach for the Spartans in 1939 and 1940, helping the team to a 24–1 record over the two seasons.

Schedule

Team players in the NFL
The following San Jose State players were selected in the 1941 NFL Draft.

The following player ended his San Jose State career in 1940, was not drafted, but played in the NFL.

Notes

References

San Jose State
San Jose State Spartans football seasons
California Collegiate Athletic Association football champion seasons
San Jose State Spartans Spartans football